The 1929–30 season was the 30th season of competitive football in Belgium. The Belgium national football team were one of the 4 European nations to enter the first FIFA World Cup, organized in Uruguay. They were drawn in group 4 with United States and Paraguay but lost both of their matches. RCS Brugeois won their third Premier Division title by finishing one point ahead of title contender R Antwerp FC.

Overview
At the end of the season, RRC de Bruxelles and RRC de Gand were relegated to the Division I, while RFC Montegnée (Division I winner) and Tubantia FAC were promoted to the Premier Division. The Promotion – the third level in Belgian football – was won by CS Schaerbeek, Belgica FC Edegem and EFC Hasselt. The three clubs were replaced by the 12th, 13th and 14th placed teams in the Division I, i.e. respectively White Star AC, Vilvorde FC and RCS Verviétois.

National team

* Belgium score given first

Key
 H = Home match
 A = Away match
 N = On neutral ground
 F = Friendly
 WCFR = World Cup First Round
 o.g. = own goal

Honours

Final league tables

Premier Division

Division I

External links
RSSSF archive – Final tables 1895–2002
Belgian clubs history